06:21:03:11 Up Evil is an album by Front 242, released in 1993.

Album title

Utilising a simple alphanumeric conversion from numbers to letters, i.e. 1=A, 2=B, 3=C, ..., 26=Z, the title can be interpreted as:

 06 = F
 21 = U
 03 = C
 11 = K

Which gives a full album title of Fuck Up Evil.

Critical reception
Trouser Press called the album "strong but not striking," and preferred 05:22:09:12 Off. Entertainment Weekly called it "a tad ambitious," writing that "this aural exorcist is more gripping than previous efforts."

Track listing

Track 12 & 13 on CD version only.

Personnel 

Daniel Bressanutti – Producer
Patrick Codenys – Producer
Jean-Luc de Meyer – Vocals
Craig Leon – Director, Engineer
Rob Sutton – Engineer
J. G. Thirlwell – Producer, Remixing
Andy Wallace – Mixing
Cassell Webb – Director, Vocals (background), Engineer

References 

1993 albums
Front 242 albums
Red Rhino Records albums
Epic Records albums